Hermes Martínez Misal (born September 23, 1979) is a Colombian professional soccer player.

External links
 El Grafico Profile 

1979 births
Living people
Colombian footballers
Millonarios F.C. players
Alianza F.C. footballers
Valledupar F.C. footballers
San Salvador F.C. footballers
C.D. Luis Ángel Firpo footballers
C.D. Chalatenango footballers
C.D. Águila footballers
Expatriate footballers in El Salvador
Association football defenders
People from Valledupar